The Constituent Assembly was the tenth Constituent Assembly of Peru, convened by the government of General Francisco Morales Bermudez to facilitate the return of democracy following a decade of the self-styled Revolutionary Government of the Armed Forces. It was settled on 28 July 1978 and was led by Víctor Raúl Haya de la Torre, historical leader of the American Popular Revolutionary Alliance. Its main mission was to develop a new constitution replacing the old 1933 Constitution. This new Constitution was enacted and promulgated on 12 July 1979, and entered into force on 28 July 1980, on the opening of the constitutional government of the architect Fernando Belaúnde Terry. It was replaced 14 years later by the 1993 Constitution.

Composition and Structure

Board
Víctor Raúl Haya de la Torre, President
Luis Alberto Sánchez, First Vice President and Constitution Committee Chairman
Ernesto Alayza Grundy, Second Vice President
Jorge Lozada Stanbury, First Secretary
 Rafael Vega García, Second Secretary
 Manuel Adrianzen Castillo, Pro Secretary
Carlos Roca, Librarian Pro Secretary
Moisés Woll Dávila, Treasurer

Representatives
Peruvian Aprista Party
1. Víctor Raúl Haya de la Torre
2. Ramiro Prialé
3. Andrés Townsend
4. Fernando León de Vivero
5. Carlos Manuel Cox
6. Luis Heysen
7. Carlos Enrique Melgar
8. Carlos Enrique Ferreyros
9. Javier Valle Riestra
10. Luis Rodríguez Vildosola
11. Héctor Vargas Haya
12. Humberto Carranza Piedra
13. Eulogio Tapia Olarte
14. Lucio Muñiz Flores
15. Luis Rivera Tamayo
16. Jorge Lozada Stanbury
17. Alfonso Ramos Alva
18. Alan García Pérez
19. Gustavo García Mundaca
20. Mario Peláez Bazán
21. Julio Cruzado Zavala
22. Luis Alberto Sánchez
23. Romualdo Biaggi Rodríguez
24. Guillermo Baca Aguinaga
25. Jorge Torres Vallejo
26. Saturnino Berrospi Mendez
27. Carlos Roca
28. Urbina Julve Ciriaco
29. Lucio Galarza Villar
30. Arnaldo Alvarado
31. Luis Negreiros
32. Josmell A. Muñoz Córdova
33. Enrique Chirinos Soto
34. Francisco Chirinos Soto
35. Arturo Miranda Valenzuela
36. Pedro Arana Quiroz
37. César Vizcarra Vargas

Christian People's Party
38. Luis Bedoya Reyes
39. Federico Tovar Freire
40. Xavier Barrón
41. Alberto Thorndike Elmore
42. Andrés Aramburu Menchaca
43. Clohaldo Salazar Penailillo
44. Mario Polár Ugarteche
45. Roberto Ramírez del Villar
46. Óscar Olivares Montano
47. Edwin Montesinos Ruiz
48. Rafael Vega García
49. Lauro Muñoz Garay
50. Ernesto Alayza Grundy
51. Moisés Woll Dávila
52. Manuel Kawashito Nagana
53. Pedro Gotuzzo Fernandini
54. Gabriela Porto Cárdenas de Power
55. Rafael Risco Boado
56. Genix Ruiz Hidalgo
57. Miguel Ángel Arévalo del Valle
58. Jorge Neyra Bisso
59. Celso Sotomarino Chávez
60. Armando Buendía Gutiérrez
61. Miguel Ángel Mufarech Nemy
62. Ruben Chang Gamarra

Popular Workers Student Farmers Front
63. Hugo Blanco
64. Genaro Ledesma
65. Magda Benavides Morales
66. Hernán Cuentas Anci
67. German Chamba Calle
68. Ricardo Napuri Schapiro
69. Enrique Fernández Chacón
70. Juan Cornejo Gómez
71. César Augusto Mateu Moya
72. Romain Ovidio Montoya Chávez
73. Victoriano Lázaro Gutiérrez
74. Saturnino Paredes Macedo

Peruvian Communist Party
75. Raúl Acosta Salas
76. Eduardo Castillo Sánchez
77. Luis Alberto Delgado Bejar
78. Jorge del Prado
79. Isodoro Gamarra Ramírez
80. Alejandro Olivera

Revolutionary Socialist Party
81. Antonio Aragón Gallegos
82. Miguel Echeandía Urbina
83. Avelino Mar Arias
84. Antonio Meza Cuadra
85. Leonidas Rodríguez Figueroa
86. Alberto Ruiz Eldredge

Popular Democratic Union
87. Carlos Malpica Silva Santisteban
88. Javier Diez Canseco
89. Ricardo Díaz Chávez
90. Víctor Cuadros Paredes

Workers and Farmers National Front
91. Pedro Cáceres Velásquez
92. Roger Cáceres Velásquez
93. Ernesto Sánchez Fajardo
94. Jesús Veliz Lizarraga

Christian Democrat Party
95. Héctor Cornejo Chávez
96. Carlos Arturo Moretti Ricardi

Peruvian Democratic Movement
97. Marco Antonio Garrido Malo
98. Javier Ortiz de Zevallos

Odriist National Union
99. Manuel Adrianzen Castillo
100. Víctor Freundt Rosell

Innovations of the Constitution
The main innovations of this Constitution, compared to its predecessor, were:

The President, the two Vice-Presidents and members of Congress (deputies and senators) would be elected jointly every five years in general elections (previous renovations were abolished parliamentary by thirds or halves)
The set up the second round of the elections for President, should not reach more than half (50% plus one) of the votes validly cast
Strengthened the authority of the President of the Republic. This could be seen "in whole or in part" the bills passed in Congress and could dissolve the House of Deputies if it censured three of the Presidential Cabinet. Could also grant pardons and commute sentences. It also gave him more power over the budget, which allowed a greater capacity to implement its policies.
Corrected parliamentary excessive powers referred to in the Constitution of 1933
Limited death penalty only for cases of treason in foreign war. It was abolished for crimes like murder and others included in the law.
Established citizenship for all Peruvians from 18 years (before the minimum age was 21 years)
It repealed the restriction on voting by illiterate
Watched the insurgency right (obviously, to defend the constitutional order and not to alter or bruise)
Created the Constitutional Tribunal of Peru, as the controlling body of the Constitution
On the economic side, the rules would be the social market economy, corporate pluralism and freedom of trade and industry

1978 in law
1978 in Peru
Peruvian legislation
Political history of Peru